King's School is a primary school for boys from the Early Learning Centre (4-years-old) to Year 8 (13-years-old). It is situated in Auckland, New Zealand, and it also has strong links to the Anglican church; the Anglican Bishop of Auckland and the Dean of Auckland are permanent members of the school's Board Of Governors. The school sits on the former site of King's College and was established there on 6 June 1922 when the College moved to its current site in the South Auckland region of Otahuhu. Boys at King's School are offered a variety of curriculum activities. These include numeracy, literacy, Christian education, physical education, science, technology, art, music, drama, band and French.

History
The school was registered as "King’s Preparatory School Auckland" in 1921 and opened on 6 June 1922 with 164 boys, after the King’s College Secondary Department moved to Middlemore. The King's College headmaster, Colonel Charles Thomas Major, passed the site in Remuera to the newly formed King’s School Board of Governors, and continued to play an active role at the school.

1922–1930
The first Chairman of the Board of Governors was Professor H S Dettman and the first Headmaster was A Clifton-Smith, who arrived from The Hutchins School. In 1927 Lt-Col T H Dawson, took over as Board Chairman and J G T Castle succeeded Clifton-Smith as Headmaster. The original stables were converted into a school chapel dedicated in 1928 by  A W Averill, Archbishop of New Zealand and officially named The Chapel of the Holy Child.

1931–1940

In 1931 J M Beaufort was appointed Headmaster and the school roll had dropped to 141 with 34 boarders. 1934 saw Colonel Charles Major take control of the school, after the resignation of Beaufort, pending the arrival of his son-in-law, John Morris in 1936. During these difficult times the school was run in conjunction with King's College. Bishop Averill was appointed as Chairman of the Board of Governors in 1935. In 1936 Colonel Major took over the Chairman position, the new Hanna Block was built and John Morris became headmaster. In 1938 S J Hanna became Chairman of the Board of Governors. Charles Major died in London in November.

1941–1960
During the war years the school roll continued to rise reaching 260 with 76 boarders in 1943. The same year saw the return of the Headmaster from war service. In 1949 a new, enlarged swimming pool was opened and the school roll was now at 275 including 87 boarders. The construction of the War Memorial Hall commenced in 1954 and was completed in 1955, dedicated by the Bishop of Auckland, Bishop Simkin. In 1959 the roll was at 317 with 104 boarders.

1961–1980
In 1961 Dr D L Richwhite began his 13-year term as Chairman of the Board of Governors. The following year saw the creation of 'The Friends of King’s School', originally called 'The King’s School Association'. The resignation of John Morris as Headmaster after 30 years service and the appointment of R J Pengelly as his successor occurred in 1965. In 1967 the first major development appeal was launched to fund the construction of the Kerridge Block. In 1974 Dr D L Richwhite retired as Board Chairman. The new 25-metre swimming pool was also completed and dedicated. The first year of weekly boarding was 1979.

1981–1990
The King’s School Foundation was formed in 1984. In 1986 a Friends’ Gala Day raised $66,000 towards the construction of the pavilion to be later known as the Arthur Lennan Pavilion situated above No. 2 Field. Pengelly retired after 22 years as Headmaster in 1987 and was replaced by B M Butler the long-standing Headmaster of Huntley School. The Greening of King’s Appeal launched to fund the construction of an Astro Turf playing field on the site of the No 1 field. The school roll was now 575.

Pengelly was dismissed in 1987.

1991–present

1992 was the last year of boarding. The boarding house closed and the two remaining dormitories on the top floor of the Hanna Block were converted into classrooms. In 1993 further extensions to the Chapel included a new south annex with the nave being extended and the addition of a choir changing room. The dedication of the new extensions was performed by Old Boy, Bishop Bruce Gilberd on 13 June. The new technology centre was opened in 1994 occupying the area of the former assembly hall/gymnasium. 1997 was the 75th anniversary of the opening of the school, and the JR Fletcher Performing Arts Centre was dedicated by the Bishop of Auckland and Board Member, John Paterson. The King’s School Old Boys’ Association was launched with Simon Moore the Inaugural President. As the school moved into the 21st century Bret Butler retired after 12 years as Headmaster. At the commencement of Term 2 Neil McWhannell took over as Headmaster. The Aquadome was officially opened by Sir Edmund Hillary on Friday 20 July 2001. At the end of the year Neil McWhannell retired and returned to Australia. In 2002 Harvey Rees-Thomas was appointed headmaster for a year to allow the Board of Governors to carry out a search for the new headmaster. Tony Sissons took over as the 10th Headmaster of King’s School in 2003. Construction of the Light House Project was started at the beginning of 2006 and was officially opened in August 2007. Work began on the Sportsdome in February 2008 and was completed in Term 3 2008. A new project called the Centennial Building will replace the old Hanna block. Work is scheduled to finish in 2017

Headmasters
 A Clifton-Smith 1922–1927
 J G T Castle 1927–1931
 J M Beaufort 1931–1934
 Colonel Charles Thomas Major 1934–1936
 John Morris 1936–1965
 Richard J Pengelly 1965–1987
 Malcolm R Long (Acting) June - December 1987
 Bret M Butler 1988–2000
 Neil McWhannell 2000–2001
 Harvey Rees-Thomas 2001–2002
 Tony Sissons 2003–Present

Former pupils
George Tupou V, King of Tonga
Henry Lamb Kennedy, Member of the Legislative Council of Fiji

House system
The school incorporates a house system with six separate houses; this system is used for sports competition and friendly rivalry among the students and staff alike. The houses compete each year for the Shale House Trophy and the Collins Shield for Sport. Each house, in conjunction to the school colour of maroon, also has a corresponding colour:
 Averill – named after Archbishop of New Zealand, Alfred Averill – Yellow. 
 Bruce – named after founder of King's College, Graham Bruce – Royal / Navy Blue.
 Major – named after Col. Charles Thomas Major – Red.
 Marsden – named after the first Anglican missionary to NZ, Samuel Marsden – Cambridge Blue.
 Morris – named after Headmaster John Morris – Brown.
 Selwyn – named after Archbishop of New Zealand George Augustus Selwyn – Green.

Coat of arms

References

External links
 King's School Website
 2007 ERO report

Boys' schools in New Zealand
Educational institutions established in 1922
Primary schools in Auckland
Anglican schools in New Zealand
1922 establishments in New Zealand